Louis Croenen (born 4 January 1994) is a Belgian competitive swimmer. He competed in the 4 × 200 metre freestyle relay event at the 2012 Summer Olympics. In 2016 he competed at the 2016 Summer Olympics in the men's 200 metre butterfly event and the men's 4 x 200 metre freestyle relay event.

He has qualified to represent Belgium at the 2020 Summer Olympics.

References

External links

1994 births
Living people
Sportspeople from Turnhout
Olympic swimmers of Belgium
Swimmers at the 2012 Summer Olympics
Swimmers at the 2016 Summer Olympics
Swimmers at the 2020 Summer Olympics
Belgian male freestyle swimmers
20th-century Belgian people
21st-century Belgian people